In mathematics, the greedy algorithm for Egyptian fractions is a greedy algorithm, first described by Fibonacci, for transforming rational numbers into Egyptian fractions. As the name indicates, these representations have been used as long ago as ancient Egypt, but the first published systematic method for constructing such expansions was described in 1202 in the Liber Abaci of Leonardo of Pisa (Fibonacci). It is called a greedy algorithm because at each step the algorithm chooses greedily the largest possible unit fraction that can be used in any representation of the remaining fraction.

Fibonacci actually lists several different methods for constructing Egyptian fraction representations. He includes the greedy method as a last resort for situations when several simpler methods fail; see Egyptian fraction for a more detailed listing of these methods.

However, the term Fibonacci expansion usually refers, not to this method, but to representation of integers as sums of Fibonacci numbers.

Algorithm and examples
Fibonacci's algorithm expands the fraction  to be represented, by repeatedly performing the replacement

(simplifying the second term in this replacement as necessary).  For instance:

in this expansion, the denominator 3 of the first unit fraction is the result of rounding  up to the next larger integer, and the remaining fraction  is the result of simplifying  = .

As each expansion step reduces the numerator of the remaining fraction to be expanded, this method always terminates with a finite expansion; however, compared to ancient Egyptian expansions or to more modern methods, this method may produce expansions that are quite long, with large denominators. For instance, this method expands

while other methods lead to the much better expansion

 suggests an even more badly-behaved example, . The greedy method leads to an expansion with ten terms, the last of which has over 500 digits in its denominator; however,  has a much shorter non-greedy representation, .

Sylvester's sequence and closest approximation
Truncating this sequence to k terms and forming the corresponding Egyptian fraction, e.g. (for k = 4)

results in the closest possible underestimate of 1 by any k-term Egyptian fraction. That is, for example, any Egyptian fraction for a number in the open interval ( 1) requires at least five terms.  describes an application of these closest-approximation results in lower-bounding the number of divisors of a perfect number, while  describes applications in group theory.

Maximum-length expansions and congruence conditions

The Erdős–Straus conjecture states that all fractions  have an expansion with three or fewer terms, but when  such expansions must be found by methods other than the greedy algorithm, with the  case being covered by the congruence relationship .

More generally the sequence of fractions  that have x-term greedy expansions and that have the smallest possible denominator y for each x is

Approximation of polynomial roots
 and  describe a method of finding an accurate approximation for the roots of a polynomial based on the greedy method. Their algorithm computes the greedy expansion of a root; at each step in this expansion it maintains an auxiliary polynomial that has as its root the remaining fraction to be expanded. Consider as an example applying this method to find the greedy expansion of the golden ratio, one of the two solutions of the polynomial equation . The algorithm of Stratemeyer and Salzer performs the following sequence of steps:

If x3 is the remaining fraction after this step of the greedy expansion, it satisfies the equation , which can again be expanded as a polynomial equation with integer coefficients, .

Continuing this approximation process eventually produces the greedy expansion for the golden ratio,

Other integer sequences
In addition, the greedy expansion of any irrational number leads to an infinite increasing sequence of integers, and the OEIS contains expansions of several well known constants. Some additional entries in the OEIS, though not labeled as being produced by the greedy algorithm, appear to be of the same type.

Related expansions
In general, if one wants an Egyptian fraction expansion in which the denominators are constrained in some way, it is possible to define a greedy algorithm in which at each step one chooses the expansion

where  is chosen, among all possible values satisfying the constraints, as small as possible such that  and such that  is distinct from all previously chosen denominators. Examples of methods defined in this way include Engel expansion, in which each successive denominator must be a multiple of the previous one, and odd greedy expansion, in which all denominators are constrained to be odd numbers.

However, it may be difficult to determine whether an algorithm of this type can always succeed in finding a finite expansion.

Notes

References 

.
.
.
.
.
.
.
.
.
.
.
.
.
.

Egyptian fractions
Greedy algorithms